Neolamprologus olivaceous is a species of cichlid endemic to Lake Tanganyika where it is only known from Ruhanga Bay in the Democratic Republic of the Congo.  This species can reach a length of  TL.

References

olivaceous
Fish of the Democratic Republic of the Congo
Fish described in 1989
Taxonomy articles created by Polbot
Endemic fauna of the Democratic Republic of the Congo